Back-up collisions happen when a driver reverses the car into an object, person, or other car. Although most cars come equipped with rear view mirrors which are adequate for detecting vehicles behind a car, they are inadequate on many vehicles for detecting small children or objects close to the ground, which fall in the car's blind spot, particularly directly aft. That area has been called a "killing zone."  Large trucks have much larger blind spots that can hide entire vehicles and large adults.

Statistics
According to research by the advocacy web site kidsandcars.org, back up collisions were the leading cause (34%) for U.S. non-traffic fatalities of children under 15 from 2006–2010.

The U.S. Center for Disease Control reported that from 2001–2003, an estimated 7,475 children (CI = 4,453–10,497)  (2,492 per year) under the age of 15 were treated for automobile back-over incidents.  About 300 fatalities per year result from backup collisions.

The U.S. National Highway Traffic Safety Administration found that back-up collisions most often:
 occur in residential driveways and parking lots
 involve sport utility vehicles (SUVs) or small trucks
 occur when a parent, relative or someone known to the family is driving
 particularly affect children less than five years old

The driver of the car backing up and hitting an object, a person, another car, or property is usually considered to be at fault.

Prevention and regulation

Prevention organizations suggest that parents use common sense, and also take safety measures such as installing cross view mirrors, audible collision detectors, backup camera, or some type of reverse backup sensors. Furthermore, safer backing up is done when the driver turns completely around and looks out of the rear window of the car, rather than relying on mirrors. This provides a wider field of vision and better control of the vehicle.

In the United States, the Cameron Gulbransen Kids Transportation Safety Act of 2007 required the federal Secretary of Transportation to issue backup collision safety regulations within 3 years and require full compliance within 4 years after final rulemaking.  As of 2012, regulations are still under study.  About half of model year 2012 automobiles already have backup cameras installed.

Blind spot monitors and other technology
Blind spot monitors are an option that may include more than monitoring the sides of the vehicle.  It can include "Cross Traffic Alert," "which alerts drivers backing out of a parking space when traffic is approaching from the sides."

See also

 Advanced driver-assistance systems
 Automatic parking
 Backup camera
 Blind spot monitor
 Blind spot (vehicle)
 Car safety
 Collision avoidance system
 Dry steering
 Experimental Safety Vehicle (ESV)
 Intelligent Parking Assist System
 Intelligent car
 Lane departure warning system
 Laser rangefinder
 Objects in mirror are closer than they appear
 Omniview technology
 Parking
 Parking sensors
 Precrash system
 Rear-view mirror
 Side-view mirror
 Sonar
 Vehicular automation
 Wing mirror

References

External links

Vehicle safety technologies
Road collisions by type